IBW may refer to:

Ideal body weight
 Impact Based Warning, issued by the National Weather Service
Institute of the Black World (1969–83), a think tank based in Atlanta, Georgia
International Business Wales
I.B.W., a 1989 album by Japanese rock band Bakufu Slump